The 2022 TBL season is the fifth season of The Basketball League (TBL). The league expanded from 29 teams in the 2021 season to 44. For the 2022 season, the National Basketball League of Canada (NBLC) announced that they had agreed to inter-league series play with several teams from The Basketball League. The games played between the teams from the two leagues are included in their respective regular season standings for each league.

League changes
On September 27, the Albany Patroons rejoined the league after opting out of the 2021 season. The 2021 teams that withdrew due to the ongoing COVID-19 pandemic: the Salem Capitals (formerly the San Diego Waves from the 2019 season), Temecula Eagles, and Vancouver Volcanoes (previously announced as the Portland Storm), returned from hiatus.

On June 4, 2021, the Beaumont Panthers, led by retired basketball player Kendrick Perkins and his cousin, Jay McDonald, were added as an expansion team for the 2022 season.  On October 4, the Citizen Potawatomi Nation, near Shawnee, Oklahoma, announced a basketball team named the Potawatomi Fire would join the league. By the start of the season, the league had also added the Atlantic City Gambits, Bakersfield Magic, Central Alabama Jaguars, Cincinnati Warriors, Connecticut Cobras, Indiana All-Americans, Kentucky Enforcers, Lansing Pharaohs, Lebanon Leprechauns, Lehigh Valley Legends, Medora Timberjacks, Pennsylvania Kings, Reading Rebels, Rockwall 7ers, SoCal Moguls, Sugarland Imperials, Tallahassee Southern Kings, and Toledo Glass City B.C.

The league also lost ten teams from the 2021 season: Atlanta Empire, Columbus Condors, Houston Push, Indy Express, Lewisville Leopards, Midtown Prestige, Omaha's Finest, San Diego Guardians, Vegas Ballers, and West Coast Breeze. The Atlanta Empire claim to be returning 2023.

The Avon Aces, which had been announced as 2021 expansion team before withdrawing due to the pandemic, was not mentioned as returning. The Arizona HEET and Topeka Wizards were also announced as expansion teams, but were removed during the 2021 offseason.

Standings
Final standings:

x – qualified for playoffs; z – Conference champion

Central Conference

Central

Eastern Conference

Northeast

Southeast

Midwest Conference

Lower Midwest

Upper Midwest

Western Conference

West

Playoffs

References

External links

The Basketball League seasons
TBL Draft
2022 in basketball leagues